is a song by Japanese rock band Asian Kung-Fu Generation. It was released as single on 4 August 2021 and it was used as the theme song for the 2021 anime film, My Hero Academia: World Heroes' Mission. The single's B-side, Flowers also added as insert song for the same film. The single was produced and arranged by Asian Kung-Fu Generation and Ryosuke Shimomura, who also support member for their live concerts.

Track listing

Personnel
Adapted from the single liner notes.

Asian Kung-Fu Generation
 Masafumi Gotoh – vocals, guitars
 Kiyoshi Ijichi – drums
 Kensuke Kita – guitars, vocals
 Takahiro Yamada – bass guitar, vocals

Production
 Asian Kung-Fu Generation - production
 Kenichi Koga – recording (track 1 & 2), mixing (track 1 & 2), protools programming (track 1 & 2)
 Mai Kondo – assistant engineered (track 1 & 2)
 Randy Merrill - mastering
 Kenichi Nakamura – recording (track 1 & 2)
 Ryoma Nakamura – assistant engineered (track 1 & 2)
 Hajime Yamamoto – editing (track 1 & 2)

Artwork and design
 Yusuke Nakamura – illustration

Additional musicians
 ermhoi – chorus (track 2)
 Yosuke Inoue – acoustic guitar advisor (track 2)
 Fumihiro Ibuki – drum technician (track 1 & 2)
 Mariko Hirose – strings section arrangement (track 2)
 Shuta Nishida – guitar sound adviser (track 1 & 2) guitar noise (track 1)
 Seiho – remix (track 3)
 Ryosuke Shimomura – synthesizers (track 1 & 2), programming (track 1 & 2), editing (track 1 & 2), production
 Naoto Tange – equipment staff (track 2)
 Koji Yamada – equipment staff (track 1 & 2)
 YOUSAYSOUNDS – fuzz (track 2)
 Tomoe Nakajima (Yasuko Murata Strings) – 1st violin (track 2)
 Leina Ushiyama (Yasuko Murata Strings) – 1st violin (track 2)
 Sena Oshima (Yasuko Murata Strings) – 2nd violin (track 2)
 Anzu Suhara (Yasuko Murata Strings) – 2nd violin (track 2)
 Mikiyo Kikuchi (Yasuko Murata Strings) – viola (track 2)
 Yasuko Murata (Yasuko Murata Strings) – viola (track 2)
 Robin Dupuy (Yasuko Murata Strings) – cello (track 2)
 Shuhei Ito (Yasuko Murata Strings) – cello (track 2)

Charts

Release history

References

Asian Kung-Fu Generation songs
2021 singles
Songs written by Masafumi Gotoh
2021 songs
Ki/oon Music singles